Borgonovo is a small village, part of a former municipality Stampa. It is now part of the municipality of Bregaglia in the Maloja district of the Swiss canton Graubünden, Switzerland.

Notable people 
 Alberto Giacometti, 1901 – 1966, artist, born and buried in the San Giorgio church of Borgonovo
 Giovanni Giacometti, 1868 – 1933, a Swiss painter, born in Borgonovo, the father of artists Alberto and Diego Giacometti and architect Bruno Giacometti

Bregaglia
Villages in Graubünden